Makararaja chindwinensis is a freshwater stingray found in the Chindwin River, a tributary of the Irrawaddy, in Myanmar.  It is the sole member of its genus.

References 

Myliobatiformes
Fish described in 2007